Carlos Bonet Cáceres (born 2 October 1977) is a Paraguayan football manager and former player who played as a right back. He is the current sporting director of Nacional Asunción.

Bonet was chosen to represent his country in the 2002, 2006 and 2010 FIFA World Cups. He retired in 2018, and after working for a couple of years as a sporting director, he switched to managerial roles in 2022.

Honours
Libertad
Paraguayan Primera División: 2002, 2003, 2006

References

External links

Paraguayan footballers
Paraguay international footballers
2002 FIFA World Cup players
2006 FIFA World Cup players
2010 FIFA World Cup players
1977 births
Living people
Club Sol de América footballers
Club Libertad footballers
Atlético de Rafaela footballers
Cruz Azul footballers
Cerro Porteño players
Deportivo Capiatá players
Club Nacional footballers
Liga MX players
Paraguayan Primera División players
Expatriate footballers in Argentina
Expatriate footballers in Mexico
Paraguayan expatriate sportspeople in Argentina
Paraguayan expatriate sportspeople in Mexico
Paraguayan expatriate footballers
Association football midfielders
Paraguayan football managers
Club Nacional managers